Berberis beauverdiana is a species of plant in the family Berberidaceae. It is endemic to Peru.

References

Endemic flora of Peru
beauverdiana
Near threatened plants
Taxonomy articles created by Polbot